Batisiripur, or Battisiripur, is a village in Gajapati district in Odisha, India. It's Location code is 414668

Villages in Gajapati district